The Spanish missions in Baja California were a large number of religious outposts established by Catholic religious orders, the Jesuits, the Franciscans and the Dominicans, between 1683 and 1834 to spread the Christian doctrine among the Indigenous peoples living on the Baja California peninsula. The missions gave Spain a valuable toehold in the frontier land, and introduced European livestock, fruits, vegetables, and industry into the region. Indigenous peoples were severely impacted by the introduction of European diseases such as smallpox and measles and by 1800 their numbers were a fraction of what they had been before the arrival of the Spanish.

Mexico secularized all missions in its territory in 1834 and the last of the missionaries departed in 1840.  Some of the mission churches survive and are still in use.

Background

As early as the voyages of Christopher Columbus, the Kingdom of Spain sought to establish missions to convert pagans to Catholicism in Nueva España (New Spain). New Spain consisted of the Caribbean, Mexico, and portions of what is now the Southwestern United States. To facilitate colonization, the Catholic Church awarded these lands to Spain.

In addition to the presidio (royal fort) and pueblo (town), the misión was one of three major agencies employed by the Spanish crown to extend its borders and consolidate its colonial territories. Asistencias ("sub-missions" or "contributing chapels") were small-scale missions that regularly conducted Catholic religious services on days of obligation, but lacked a resident priest.  Smaller sites called visitas ("visiting chapels") also lacked a resident priest, and were often attended only sporadically. Since 1493, the Crown of Spain had maintained missions throughout Nueva España.

Each frontier station was forced to be self-supporting, as existing means of supply were inadequate to maintain a colony of any size. To sustain a mission, the padres needed colonists or converted Indigenous Americans, called neophytes, to cultivate crops and tend livestock in the volume needed to support a fair-sized establishment.   Scarcity of imported materials and lack of skilled laborers compelled the Fathers to employ simple building materials and methods. Although the Spanish hierarchy considered the missions temporary ventures, individual settlement development was not based simply on "priestly whim."  The founding of a mission followed longstanding rules and procedures. The paperwork involved required months, sometimes years of correspondence, and demanded the attention of virtually every level of the bureaucracy. Once empowered to erect a mission in a given area, the men assigned to it chose a specific site that featured a good water supply, proximity to a population of indigenous peoples, and arable land. The padres, their military escort and often converted mainland indigenous people or mestizos initially fashioned defendable shelters, from which a base was established and the mission could grow.

Construction of the iglesia (church) constituted the focus of the settlement, and created the center of the community. The majority of mission sanctuaries were oriented on a roughly east–west axis to take the best advantage of the sun's position for interior illumination.  The workshops, kitchens, living quarters, storerooms, and other ancillary chambers were usually grouped in the form of a quadrangle, inside which religious celebrations and other events often took place.

The Native Americans

Indian peoples  encountered by the Spanish missionaries in Baja California (from north to south) were the Kumeyaay, Cocopah, Pai Pai, Kiliwa, Cochimi, Monqui, Guaycura, and Pericu.  The Kumeyaay and Cocapah practiced limited agriculture, but the majority of the Baja Californians were nomadic or semi-nomadic hunter-gatherers who eked out a living under difficult desert conditions and scarcity of fresh water.

In a policy followed throughout much of Latin America called reductions, the missionaries concentrated the Indians at or near the mission for religious instruction and training to become sedentary farmers and stock herders. Their goal was to create a self-sufficient theocracy in which the missionary, usually supported by Spanish soldiers and laymen, attempted to rule over every facet of the Indian's religious and secular lives.  The Indigenous peoples were housed often by gender, forcibly converted to Catholicism and acculturated to the Spanish Empire within the confines of the mission.  Recalcitrant indigenous peoples often ran away or revolted, and many missions maintained a precarious existence during the colonial era.  Use of firearms, corporal punishment in the form of whippings and religious ritual and psychological punishments were all methods employed by the missionaries to maintain and expand control. There were instances of armed resistance by the Indians against the missions, notably the Pericue revolt of 1734-1737, and Indians at the missions frequently ran away to escape the religious and labor regime forced on them by the missionaries or sabotaged the missionary's efforts by passive resistance.

At the time of first contact with the Spanish, the Native Americans living in Baja California may have numbered as many as 60,000. By 1762, their numbers had fallen to 21,000 and by 1800 to 5,900. The primary reason for the decline was recurrent epidemics of European diseases, primarily smallpox, measles, and typhus. The spread of disease was facilitated by the missionary's practice of congregating the population near the mission. Endemic Syphilis resulted in higher child mortality and a reduced birth rate. By the early 19th century, the tribes of Baja California were culturally extinct, except for the Kumeyaay, Cocopah, and Pai Pai.

Missions in Baja California

Fortún Jiménez de Bertadoña discovered the Baja California Peninsula in early 1534.  However, it was Hernán Cortés who recognized the peninsula as the "Island of California" in May 1535, and is therefore officially credited with the discovery. In January 1683, the Spanish government chartered an expedition consisting of three ships to transport a contingent of 200 men to the southern tip of Baja California. Under the command of the governor of Sinaloa, Isidoro de Atondo y Antillón, and accompanied by Jesuit priest Eusebio Francisco Kino, the ships made landfall in La Paz. The landing party was eventually forced to abandon its initial settlement due to the hostile response on the part of the natives.  The missionaries attempted to establish a settlement near present-day Loreto, which they named Misión San Bruno but failed for lack of supplies. Kino went on to establish a number of missions in the Pimería Alta, now located in southern Arizona, USA and Sonora, Mexico.

The Jesuit priest Juan María de Salvatierra eventually managed to establish the first permanent Spanish settlement in Baja California, the Misión Nuestra Señora de Loreto Conchó. Founded on October 19, 1697, the mission become the religious center of the peninsula and administrative capital of Las Californias. From there, other Jesuits went out to establish other settlements throughout the lower two-thirds of the peninsula, founding 17 missions and several visitas (sub-missions) between 1697 and 1767.

Unlike the mainland settlements that were designed to be self-sustaining enterprises, the remote and harsh conditions on the peninsula made it all but impossible to build and maintain these missions without ongoing assistance from the mainland. Supply lines from across the Gulf of California, including from the missions and ranches of Padre Eusebio Kino on the mainland to the Port of Guaymas, played a crucial role in keeping the Baja California mission system intact.

During the sixty years that the Jesuits were permitted to work among the natives of California, 56 members of the Society of Jesus came to the Baja California peninsula, of whom 16 died at their posts (two as martyrs). Fifteen priests and one lay brother survived the hardships, only to be subjected to enforcement of the decree launched against the Society by King Carlos III of Spain. It was rumored that the Jesuit priests had amassed a fortune on the peninsula and were becoming very powerful. On February 3, 1768 the King ordered the Jesuits forcibly expelled from the Americas and returned to the home country. Gaspar de Portolà was appointed Governor of Las Californias, with orders to supervise the Jesuit expulsion and oversee the installation of replacement Franciscan priests.

The Franciscans, under the leadership of Fray Junípero Serra, took charge of the missions and closed or consolidated several of the existing installations. A total of 39 Friars Minor toiled on the peninsula during the five years and five months of Franciscan rule. Four of them died, 10 were transferred to new northern missions, and the remainder returned to Europe.

Governor Portolà was put in command of an expedition to travel north and establish new settlements at San Diego and Monterey. Serra went along as leader of the missionaries, to establish missions in those places. On the way north, Serra founded Misión San Fernando Rey de España de Velicatá. Francisco Palóu was left in charge of the existing missions, and founded the Visita de la Presentación in 1769.

Representatives of the Dominican order arrived in 1772, and by 1800, had established nine more missions in northern Baja, all the while continuing with the administration of the former Jesuit missions. The peninsula was divided into two separate entities in 1804, with the southern one having the seat of government established in the Port of Loreto.  In 1810, Mexico sought to end Spanish colonial rule, gaining her independence in 1821, after which Mexican President Guadalupe Victoria named Lt. Col. José María Echeandía governor of Baja California Sur and divided it into four separate municipios (municipalities). The capital was moved to La Paz in 1830, after Loreto was partially destroyed by heavy rains. In 1833, after Baja California was designated as a federal territory, the governor formally put an end to the mission system by converting the missions into parish churches.

Mission administration

System Father-Presidentes  

 Father Junípero Serra (1769–1784)
 Father Francisco Palóu (acting) (1784–1785)
 Father Fermín Francisco de Lasuén (1785–1803)
 Father Pedro Estévan Tápis (1803–1812)
 Father José Francisco de Paula Señan (1812–1815)
 Father Mariano Payeras (1815–1820)
 Father José Francisco de Paula Señan (1820–1823)
 Father Vicente Francisco de Sarría (1823–1824)
 Father Narciso Durán (1824–1827)
 Father José Bernardo Sánchez (1827–1830)
 Father García Diego (1831–1835)
 Father José María González Rubio (1835–1843)
 Father José Anzar	(1843–?)

The "Father-Presidente" was the head of the Catholic missions in Alta and Baja California. He was appointed by the College of San Fernando de Mexico until 1812, when the position became known as the "Commissary Prefect" who was appointed by the Commissary General of the Indies (a Franciscan residing in Spain). Beginning in 1831, separate individuals were elected to oversee Upper and Lower California.

Mission headquarters  
 Mission San Diego de Alcalá (1769–1771)
 Mission San Carlos Borromeo de Carmelo (1771–1815)
 Mission La Purísima Concepción*(1815–1819)
 Mission San Carlos Borromeo de Carmelo (1819–1824)
 Mission San José*(1824–1827)
 Mission San Carlos Borromeo de Carmelo (1827–1830)
 Mission San José*(1830–1833)
 Mission Santa Barbara (1833–1846)

† The Rev. Payeras and the Rev. Durán remained at their resident missions during their terms as Father-Presidente, therefore those settlements became the de facto headquarters (until 1833, when all mission records were permanently relocated to Santa Barbara).

Mission locations 
There were 30 missions and 11 visitas in Baja California stretching the entire length of the Baja California Peninsula. From Playas de Rosarito through to the southernmost mission in San José del Cabo, the missions were:

Visita locations
Visitas were branch missions that allowed the priests to extend their reach into the native population at a modest cost.

In chronological order

Jesuit Establishments (1684–1767)
 Misión San Bruno, founded in 1684
 Misión de Nuestra Señora de Loreto Conchó, founded in 1697
 Visita de San Juan Bautista Londó, founded in 1699
 Misión San Francisco Javier de Viggé-Biaundó, founded in 1699
 Misión San Juan Bautista Malibat (Misión Liguí), founded in 1705
 Misión Santa Rosalía de Mulegé, founded in 1705
 Misión San Jose de Comondú founded in 1709
 Misión La Purísima Concepción de Cadegomó founded in 1720
 Misión de Nuestra Señora del Pilar de La Paz Airapí founded in 1720
 Misión Nuestra Señora de Guadalupe de Huasinapi founded in 1720
 Misión Santiago de Los Coras founded in 1721
 Misión Nuestra Señora de los Dolores del Sur Apaté, founded in 1721
 Visita de Angel de la Guarda (El Zalato), founded in 1721
 Misión Santiago el Apóstol Aiñiní (Las Coras), founded in 1724
 Misión San Ignacio Kadakaamán, founded in 1728
 Misión Estero de las Palmas de San José del Cabo Añuití, founded in 1730
 Misión Santa Rosa de las Palmas (Misión Todos Santos), founded in 1733
 Misión San Luis Gonzaga Chiriyaqui, founded in 1740
 Misión Nuestra Señora de los Dolores del Sur Chillá (Misión La Pasión), founded in 1741
 Misión Nuestra Señora del Pilar de la Paz, founded in 1748
 Misión Santa Gertrudis, founded in 1752
 Misión San Francisco Borja de Adac, founded in 1762
 Visita de Calamajué (Visita de Calamyget), founded in 1766
 Misión Santa María de los Ángeles, founded in 1767

Franciscan Establishments (1768–1773)
 Misión San Fernando Rey de España de Velicatá, founded in 1769
 Visita de San Juan de Dios, founded in 1769
 Visita de la Presentación, founded in 1769

Dominican Establishments (1774–1834)
 Misión Nuestra Señora del Santísimo Rosario de Viñadaco, founded in 1774
 Visita de San José de Magdalena, founded in 1774
 Misión Santo Domingo de la Frontera, founded in 1775
 Misión San Vicente Ferrer, founded in 1780
 Misión San Miguel Arcángel de la Frontera, founded in 1787
 Misión Santo Tomás de Aquino, founded in 1791
 Misión San Pedro Mártir de Verona, founded in 1794
 Misión Santa Catarina Virgen y Mártir, founded in 1797
 Visita de San Telmo, founded in 1798
 Misión El Descanso (Misión San Miguel la Nueva), founded in 1810
 Misión de Nuestra Señora de Guadalupe del Norte, founded in 1834

See also

On Spanish Missions in neighboring regions:
 Spanish missions in California
 Spanish missions in the Sonoran Desert

On general missionary history:
 Catholic Church and the Age of Discovery
 List of the oldest churches in Mexico

On colonial Spanish American history:
 Spanish colonization of the Americas
 California mission clash of cultures

Notes

References

Further reading
 Bolton, Herbert Eugene. 1936. Rim of Christendom. Macmillan, New York.
 Burrus, Ernest J. 1954. Kino Reports to Headquarters: Correspondence of Eusebio F. Kino, S.J., from New Spain with Rome. Instituto Historicum S.J., Rome.
 Burrus, Ernest J. 1965. Kino Writes to the Duchess. Jesuit Historical Institute, Rome.
 Mathes, W. Michael. 1969. First from the Gulf to the Pacific: The Diary of the Kino-Atondo Peninsular Expedition, December 14, 1684-January 13, 1685. Dawson's Book Shop, Los Angeles.
 Engelhardt, Zephyrin, O.F.M. Missions and Missionaries, Volume One|San Francisco: The James H. Barry Co., 1908.
 Jackson, Robert H. "Epidemic Disease and Population Decline in the Baja California Missions, 1697-1834" Southern California Quarterly 63:308-346|
 Mathes, W. Michael. 1974. Californiana III: documentos para la historia de la transformación colonizadora de California, 1679-1686. José Porrúa Turanzas, Madrid.
 Van Handel, Robert Michael. "The Jesuit and Franciscan Missions in Baja California." M.A. thesis. University of California, Santa Barbara, 1991.
 Vernon, Edward W. 2002. Las Misiones Antiguas: The Spanish Missions of Baja California, 1683-1855. Viejo Press, Santa Barbara, California.

External links
 www.ca-missions.org — The official website of the California Mission Studies Association, a good source of accurate, peer-reviewed information on Mission Era history with an extensive links page.
 California Missions article at The Catholic Encyclopedia
 Missions of Baja California and Baja California Sur
 Google earth map of the Baja missions
 Reseña histórica de las misiones de Baja California by Dr. W. Michael Mathes (in Spanish)

 

 
 
Jesuit history in North America
Spanish colonization of the Americas
New Spain